Sarel de Jong (born 16 July 1996) is a Dutch kickboxer who has been professionally competing since 2016, and is currently signed with Enfusion. She is the reigning Enfusion Bantamweight champion.

At the amateur level, she is a four time World Association of Kickboxing Organizations medalist, and has won three gold medals at the Kickboxing World Series, as well as a single gold medal with the International World Games Association.

As of December 2022, she is ranked as the fourth best pound-for-pound female kickboxer by Combat Press and fifth best by Beyond Kick. She has been continuously ranked in the pound-for-pound top ten female fighters by Combat Press since July 2019.

Kickboxing career

Two-weight Enfusion champion
De Jong made her Enfusion promotional debut at Rookies on November 20, 2016, when she faced Krystina Lexova. She won the bout by unanimous decision. De Jong next faced Sadie Siem at Enfusion Kickboxing Talents 33 on June 3, 2017. She won the fight by unanimous decision.

De Jong faced Chellina Chirino for the vacant Enfusion 64 kg title at Enfusion 69 on June 13, 2018. She won the fight by a unanimous decision. In her next appearance with the promotion, at Enfusion 75 on November 17, 2018, De Jong faced Samira Kovacevic for the 61 kg Championship. She won the fight through a fifth-round technical knockout to become a two-weight champion.

De Jong faced Victoria Lomax in a non-title bout at Enfusion 76 on December 7, 2018. She won the fight in the third round, by stoppage. Sarel De Jong suffered her first promotional loss at Enfusion 78 on February 23, 2019, when she faced the veteran Anke Van Gestel in a non-title bout, as Van Gestel won the fight by split decision.

She made her first 64 kg title defense against Sanne de Ruiter at Enfusion 85 on June 8, 2019. She won the fight by unanimous decision. Sarel De Jong would then make a defense of her 61 kg title, as she faced Madelen Søfteland at Glorious Heroes presents Enfusion Groningen on November 16, 2019. She won the fight by a unanimous decision.

De Jong faced the WAKO welterweight world champion Mallaury Kalachnikoff in a non-title bout at Enfusion 91 on December 6, 2019. She won the fight by unanimous decision. At the end of 2019, Enfusion voted her the Best Female Fighter of the Year.  

De Jong was double booked to defend her 61 kg title against Aylina "The Angel" Engel at Enfusion 97 on September 19, 2020, and her 64 kg title against Michaela Michl on November 21. She was also scheduled to participate in an ECE event on October 9, against Niamh Kinehan. De Jong retained her belt against Engel by unanimous decision. Her fight on October 9, was later cancelled, due to Kinehan's travel issues. Subsequently, De Jong was rescheduled to fight Marika Pagliaroli at Enfusion 99 on October 17, 2020. She won the fight by unanimous decision. De Jong's title defense against Michl was later postponed because of restrictions related to the COVID-19 pandemic.

De Jong was booked to fight Lucija Mudrohova at Road to ONE: Arena Friday Night Fights 2. She won the fight by knockout. After the fight, it was revealed that De Jong had suffered an anterior cruciate ligament injury, which required surgery to heal.

Enfusion bantamweight champion
De Jong faced Maria Tsiplostefanaki in a non-title bout at Enfusion 109 on June 18, 2022. She won the fight by unanimous decision. De Jong made her first Enfusion Bantamweight title defense against Vitoria De Mauro later that year, at Enfusion 116 on November 19, 2022. She retained the title by unanimous decision.

Championships and accomplishments

Amateur kickboxing
World Association of Kickboxing Organizations
 2016 WAKO Senior European K-1 Championship 65 kg
 2017 WAKO Senior World K-1 Championship 65 kg
 2017 Hungarian Kickboxing World K-1 Cup 65 kg
 2018 WAKO Senior European K-1 Championship 65 kg 
 2019 Yokoso K-1 Dutch Open 65 kg
 2019 Worldcup K-1 Austrian Classics 60 kg 
 2019 Hungarian Kickboxing K-1 World Cup 60 kg
 2019 WAKO Senior World K-1 Championship 60 kg
 2021 International Turkish European K-1 Cup
International World Games Association
 2017 World Games Poland 65 kg

Professional kickboxing
Enfusion
Enfusion Bantamweight World Championship
Three successful title defenses
Enfusion 64 kg World Championship
One successful title defense

Awards
Combat Press
2019 "Female Fighter of the Year" nominee
2020 "Female Fighter of the Year" nominee
Enfusion
2019 "Female Fighter of the Year"

Fight record

|-  style="background:"
| 2023-05-13 || ||align=left| Milana Bjelogorić || Enfusion 122 || Wuppertal, Germany ||  ||  || 
|-
|-  style="background:#cfc"
| 2022-12-16 || Win ||align=left| Laura Pileri || Enfusion Dubai || Dubai, United Arab Emirates || Decision (Unanimous) || 3 || 3:00
|-
|-  style="background:#cfc"
| 2022-11-19 || Win ||align=left| Vitoria De Mauro || Enfusion 116 || Groningen, Netherlands || Decision (Unanimous) || 5 || 3:00 
|-
! style=background:white colspan=9 |
|-
|-  style="background:#CCFFCC"
| 2022-09-17 || Win ||align=left| Sofia Oliveira || Enfusion 110 || Alkmaar, Netherlands || Decision (Unanimous) || 3 || 3:00 
|-
|-  style="background:#CCFFCC"
| 2022-06-18|| Win ||align=left| Maria Tsiplostefanaki || Enfusion 109 || Groningen, Netherlands || Decision (Unanimous) || 3 || 3:00
|-
|-  bgcolor="#CCFFCC"
| 2021-06-11|| Win ||align=left| Lucija Mudrohova || Road to ONE: Arena Friday Night Fights 2 || Belgrade, Serbia || KO || 1 ||  
|-  style="background:#cfc;"
| 2020-10-17|| Win ||align=left| Marika Pagliaroli || Enfusion 99 || Wuppertal, Germany || Decision (Unanimous) || 3 || 3:00 
|-  style="background:#cfc;"
| 2020-09-19|| Win ||align=left| Aylina Engel || Enfusion 97 || Alkmaar, Netherlands || Decision (Unanimous) || 5 || 3:00 
|-
! style=background:white colspan=9 |
|-  bgcolor="#CCFFCC"
| 2019-12-06|| Win||align=left| Mallaury Kalachnikoff || Enfusion 91 || Abu Dhabi, United Arab Emirates || Decision (Unanimous) || 5 || 3:00
|-  bgcolor="#CCFFCC"
| 2019-11-16|| Win||align=left| Madelen Søfteland || Glorious Heroes presents Enfusion Groningen || Groningen, Netherlands || Decision (Unanimous) || 5 || 3:00
|-
! style=background:white colspan=9 |
|-
|-  bgcolor="#CCFFCC"
| 2019-06-08|| Win||align=left| Sanne de Ruijter || Enfusion 85 || Groningen, Netherlands || Decision (Unanimous) || 5 || 3:00
|-
! style=background:white colspan=9 |
|-
|-  bgcolor="#FFBBBB"
| 2019-02-23|| Loss||align=left| Anke Van Gestel || Enfusion 78 || Eindhoven, Netherlands || Decision (Split) || 3 || 3:00
|-  bgcolor="#CCFFCC"
| 2018-12-07|| Win||align=left| Victoria Lomax || Enfusion 76 || Abu Dhabi, United Arab Emirates || TKO || 2 || 
|-  bgcolor="#CCFFCC"
| 2018-11-17|| Win||align=left| Samira Kovacevic || Enfusion 75 || Groningen, Netherlands || TKO || 5 || 
|-
! style=background:white colspan=9 |
|-
|-  style="text-align:center; background:#fbb;"
| 2018-09-29 || Loss||align=left| Wang Cong || David Zunwu World Fighting Championship || Macau || Decision  || 3 || 3:00
|-  bgcolor="#CCFFCC"
| 2018-06-13|| Win||align=left| Chellina Chirino  || Enfusion 69 || Groningen, Netherlands || Decision (Unanimous) || 5 || 3:00 
|-
! style=background:white colspan=9 |
|-
|-  bgcolor="#CCFFCC"
| 2017-12-16 || Win||align=left| Alessia Coluccia || FigtersGlory || Drachten,  Netherlands || Decision (Unanimous) || 3 || 3:00
|-
|-  bgcolor="#CCFFCC"
| 2017-09-30|| Win||align=left| Layla Hassan || Battle Events || Arnheim, Netherlands || Decision  || 3 || 3:00 

|-  bgcolor="#CCFFCC"
| 2017-06-03|| Win||align=left| Sadie Siem || Enfusion Kickboxing Talents 33 || Groningen, Netherlands || Decision (Unanimous) || 3 || 3:00 
|-
|-  bgcolor="#CCFFCC"
| 2016-11-20|| Win||align=left| Krystina Lexova || Enfusion Rookies || Groningen, Netherlands || Decision (Unanimous) || 3 || 3:00
|-
| colspan=9 | Legend:    

|-  bgcolor="#fbb"
| 2021-10-|| Loss||align=left| Milana Bjelorgic || 2021 WAKO World Championships, 1/8 Final || Jesolo, Italy || Decision || 3 || 2:00 

|-  bgcolor="#cfc"
| 2021-04-11 || Win ||align=left| Sultan Unal || 2021 International Turkish European Cup, Final || Antalya, Turkey || Decision || 3 || 2:00 
|-
! style=background:white colspan=9 |
|-
|-  bgcolor="#cfc"
| 2021-04-10 || Win ||align=left| Esra Yalin || 2021 International Turkish European Cup, Semifinal || Antalya, Turkey || Decision || 3 || 2:00 
|-
|-  bgcolor="#cfc"
| 2021-04-09 || Win ||align=left| Havva Kaynak || 2021 International Turkish European Cup, Quarterfinals || Antalya, Turkey || Decision || 3 || 2:00 
|-

|-  bgcolor="#fbb"
| 2019-10-|| Loss||align=left| Milana Bjelorgic || 2019 WAKO World Championships, Semi Final || Sarajevo, Bosnia and Herzgovina || Decision (2:1) || 3 || 2:00 
|-
! style=background:white colspan=9 |

|-  bgcolor="#cfc"
| 2019-10-|| Win ||align=left| Emilia Czerwinska || 2019 WAKO World Championships, Quarter Final || Sarajevo, Bosnia and Herzgovina || Decision (3:0) || 3 || 2:00 

|-  bgcolor="#cfc"
| 2019-10-|| Win ||align=left| Sofia Oliveira || 2019 WAKO World Championships, 1/8 Final || Sarajevo, Bosnia and Herzgovina || Decision (3:0) || 3 || 2:00 

|-  bgcolor="#cfc"
| 2019-05-19 || Win||align=left| Iryna Chernova || 2019 Hungarian K-1 Kickboxing World Cup, Final || Budapest, Hungary || Decision  || 3 || 2:00 
|-
! style=background:white colspan=9 |
|-
|-  bgcolor="#cfc"
| 2019-05-18 || Win||align=left| Stella Hemetsberger || 2019 Hungarian K-1 Kickboxing World Cup, Semifinal || Budapest, Hungary || Decision  || 3 || 2:00 
|-

|-  bgcolor="#cfc"
| 2019-04-14 || Win||align=left| Kaisa Musikka || 2019 Worldcup Austrian Classics K-1, Final || Innsbruck, Austria || Decision  || 3 || 2:00 
|-
! style=background:white colspan=9 |
|-
|-  bgcolor="#cfc"
| 2019-04-13 || Win||align=left| Lucia Szabova || 2019 Worldcup Austrian Classics K-1, Semifinal || Innsbruck, Austria || Decision  || 3 || 2:00 
|-

|-  bgcolor="#cfc"
| 2019-03-23 || Win||align=left| Adva Ohayon || 2019 Yokoso K-1 Dutch Open, Final || Amsterdam, Netherlands || Decision  || 3 || 2:00 
|-
! style=background:white colspan=9 |

|-  bgcolor="#cfc"
| 2018-10-|| Win||align=left| Teodora Manic || 2018 WAKO European Championships, Final || Bratislava, Slovakia || Decision (3:0) || 3 || 2:00 
|-
! style=background:white colspan=9 |

|-  bgcolor="#cfc"
| 2018-10-|| Win||align=left| Sarka Melinova || 2018 WAKO European Championships, Semi Final || Bratislava, Slovakia || Decision (3:0) || 3 || 2:00 

|-  bgcolor="#fbb"
| 2018-05-13|| Loss||align=left| Erica Björnestrand || 2018 IFMA World Championships, First Round || Cancun, Mexico || Decision (29:28) || 3 || 3:00

|-  bgcolor="#fbb"
| 2017-11-|| Loss ||align=left| Teodora Manic || 2017 WAKO World Championships, Final || Budapest, Hungary || Decision (2:1) || 3 || 2:00 
|-
! style=background:white colspan=9 |

|-  bgcolor="#cfc"
| 2017-11-|| Win ||align=left| Roza Gumienna || 2017 WAKO World Championships, Semi Final || Budapest, Hungary || Decision (3:0) || 3 || 2:00 

|-  bgcolor="#cfc"
| 2017-11-|| Win ||align=left| Adelina Zarubina || 2017 WAKO World Championships, Quarter Final || Budapest, Hungary || Decision (3:0) || 3 || 2:00 

|-  bgcolor="#cfc"
| 2017-07-27|| Win||align=left| Teodora Manic || 2017 WAKO at the World Games, Final || Wroclaw, Poland || Decision (3:0) || 3 || 2:00 
|-
! style=background:white colspan=9 |

|-  bgcolor="#cfc"
| 2017-07-26|| Win||align=left| Kaitlin Young || 2017 WAKO at the World Games, Semi Final || Wroclaw, Poland || Decision (3:0) || 3 || 2:00 

|-  bgcolor="#cfc"
| 2017-07-25|| Win||align=left| Cristina Caruso || 2017 WAKO at the World Games, Quarter Final || Wroclaw, Poland || Decision (3:0) || 3 || 2:00 
|-
|-  bgcolor="#fbb"
| 2016-10-28 || Loss ||align=left| Cristina Caruso || 2016 WAKO Senior European K-1 Championship, Semifinal || Maribor, Slovenia || Decision || 3 || 2:00 
|-
! style=background:white colspan=9 |
|-
|-  bgcolor="#cfc"
| 2016-10-28 || Win||align=left| Yasin Gonkur Dundar || 2016 WAKO Senior European K-1 Championship, Quarterfinal || Maribor, Slovenia || Decision || 3 || 2:00 
|-

| colspan=9 | Legend:

See also
List of female kickboxers

References 

Dutch female kickboxers
1996 births
Living people
Competitors at the 2017 World Games
People from Delfzijl
Sportspeople from Groningen (province)